O Comércio do Porto (lit. Porto Trade) was a Portuguese daily newspaper. First appearing in Porto under the title O Commercio in 1854, the newspaper folded in 2005 after more than 150 years of continuous publication. At the time of its closure, it was the second-oldest newspaper published in Portugal after O Açoriano Oriental.

In the aftermath of the Carnation Revolution in 1974, circulation of O Comércio do Porto reached 120,000 copies before declining during the 1990s, prompting its sale to Spanish media company Prensa Ibérica in 2001. It was published in its later years as a regional newspaper only. The last edition was printed on 30 July 2005. In 2008 an agreement was made between Prensa Ibérica and the city authorities of Vila Nova de Gaia, allowing physical copies of O Comércio do Porto and a collection of several thousand photographs and engravings published in the newspaper over its history to be displayed at the city's Municipal Archive.

Its last director was António Matos.

Notes

References

External links
O Comércio do Porto online

1854 establishments in Portugal
2005 disestablishments in Portugal
Defunct newspapers published in Portugal
Mass media in Porto
Portuguese-language newspapers
Newspapers established in 1854
Publications disestablished in 2005